Holden High School is a private, non-profit school located in Orinda, Contra Costa County, California, United States.

Founded in 1969, it is accredited by the Western Association of Schools and Colleges and its diplomas are recognized by the State of California.

The students are from all over the San Francisco Bay Area, and reflect the area's diversity.

References 
 Holden High Student Handbook, 2008–2009, Orinda, California

External links
 Holden High School website

High schools in Contra Costa County, California
Orinda, California
Private high schools in California
1969 establishments in California